LNER Class A4 4483 Kingfisher was a Class A4 steam locomotive of the London and North Eastern Railway.

History
Kingfisher was built at Doncaster Works in 1936 and entered service on 26 December of that year. Originally painted in LNER Apple Green livery, but was repainted in Garter Blue livery in June 1937. It carried the name Kingfisher throughout its existence. After World War II it was renumbered as 24. On nationalisation it was allotted the British Railways number of 60024. Kingfisher was used in its final years to work express trains from Glasgow to Aberdeen, along with fellow class members 60019 Bittern and 60034 Lord Faringdon. The last of the A4 class in common use along with Bittern, it was withdrawn for scrapping on 5 September 1966 from Aberdeen Ferry hill shed (61B). However, due to a shortage of motive power available at the depot on 14 September 1966, Kingfisher worked the 08:25 Glasgow to Aberdeen return trip which heralded the final revenue earning service for an A4.

Preservation plans were halted when problems were discovered with the engine's firebox and the locomotive was delivered to scrap merchants Hughes Bolckow of North Blyth in late November, being cut up in February 1967.

References 

Individual locomotives of Great Britain
4483
Scrapped locomotives
Standard gauge steam locomotives of Great Britain